Kika may refer to:

People
 Kika de la Garza (1927–2017), American politician
 Kika Edgar (born 1985), Mexican actress and singer
 Kika Karadi (born 1975), American contemporary artist
 Kika Markham (born 1940), English actress
 Kika Mirylees, British actress
 Kika Perez, Colombian-American actress and TV host
 Francisca Nazareth (born 2002), Portuguese footballer
 Kristina Đukić (2000–2021), Serbian YouTuber

Other
 Foundation KiKa, a Dutch foundation for child cancer
 KiKA, a children's television channel based in Erfurt, Germany
 Kika (film), a 1993 Spanish-language film
 Kika (retailer), an Austrian chain of furniture stores
 Kika (Suikoden), a Suikoden character
 Tropical Storm Kika, a tropical cyclone in the central Pacific basin in the 2008
 KIKA, a fictional TV station in an episode of Monk
 "Kika", a Seakret song featuring MC Zaac and Feid
 "Kika", a 6ix9ine song featuring Tory Lanez from Dummy Boy

See also
 Kikas (disambiguation)